Hammer on a Drum is the third album by the Payolas, released in 1983. The title comes from a line in the song "Where Is This Love." The album is only available on vinyl and cassette; it has not been released on CD. The album was #26 for 5 weeks in the Canadian charts.

Track listing
All songs written by Bob Rock and Paul Hyde.

Side One
 "I'll Find Another (Who Can Do It Right)" – 3:37
 "Where Is This Love" – 5:54
 "Wild West" – 3:11
 "Perhaps Some Day" – 3:30
 "Never Said I Loved You" – 3:18 (with Carole Pope)-- (#8 Canada)

Side Two
 "No Prisoners" – 5:16
 "Christmas Is Coming" – 3:40
 "I Am A City" – 5:09
 "Hungry" – 4:10
 "People Who Have Great Lives" – 2:26

Personnel
 Paul Hyde: lead vocals
 Christopher Livingston: keyboards
 Bob Rock: guitars
 Chris Taylor: drums

with:

 Barry Muir: bass guitar
 Carole Pope: vocals on "Never Said I Loved You"

References

External links
 

1983 albums
Payolas albums
Albums produced by Mick Ronson
A&M Records albums